Blair Horn (born July 17, 1961) is a Canadian former rower, who was a member of the Canadian men's eights team that won the gold medal at the 1984 Summer Olympics in Los Angeles, California.

Born in Kelowna, British Columbia, Horn is a graduate of Brentwood College School in Mill Bay, British Columbia. A 1983 graduate of the University of Washington with a B.B.A. in 1984, he was also part of their rowing squad.

Horn was later admitted to Osgoode Hall Law School where he graduated with an LL.B. in 1987. He went on to practice law at Fasken Martineau DuMoulin.

References

External links
 Canadian Olympic Committee
 

1961 births
Canadian male rowers
Living people
Olympic gold medalists for Canada
Olympic medalists in rowing
Olympic rowers of Canada
Rowers at the 1984 Summer Olympics
Sportspeople from Kelowna
Medalists at the 1984 Summer Olympics
University of Washington Foster School of Business alumni
Osgoode Hall Law School alumni
Pan American Games medalists in rowing
Pan American Games bronze medalists for Canada
Rowers at the 1983 Pan American Games
Medalists at the 1983 Pan American Games
20th-century Canadian people